Zieria adenophora, commonly known as the Araluen Zieria  is a plant in the family Rutaceae and is only found near Araluen in the Southern Tablelands of New South Wales. It is a spreading shrub with small glossy, warty leaves and white or pink four-petalled flowers in spring. It is a rare plant with fewer than one hundred plants known from only one site.

Description
Both surfaces of the leaves are warty and mostly glabrous.

The flowers are white or very pale pink and are arranged in leaf axils in groups of one to three.

Taxonomy and naming
Zieria adenophora was first formally described in 1941 by William Blakely from a specimen collected near Bells Creek Falls, Araluen. The description was published in Contributions from the New South Wales National Herbarium. The specific epithet (adenophora) is derived from the Ancient Greek word aden meaning "gland" and the suffix -phor meaning "to bear", "to carry" or "to have".

Distribution and habitat
Araluen Zieria grows on rocky hillsides near granite boulders in shrubland. It is only known from the Araluen district.

Conservation
This zieria is listed as "Endangered" under the New South Wales Threatened Species Conservation Act and under the Commonwealth Government Environment Protection and Biodiversity Conservation Act 1999 (EPBC) Act. In 2001, this zieria was only known from a population of 56 mature plants. Trampling by feral goats causes a serious threat to the survival of this plant but a fence has been constructed to deter grazing animals.

References

External links
 

adenophora
Sapindales of Australia
Flora of New South Wales
Endangered flora of Australia
Plants described in 1941